Penni Gray is an Australian actress. She was a series regular on the third series of H2O: Just Add Water, and has appeared on All Saints, Home and Away, and Terra Nova.

Works

Film

Television

Stage

References

Australian television actresses
Australian film actresses